

The Lioré et Olivier LeO 41 was a French experimental biplane built by Lioré et Olivier. The LeO 41 has been described as a "strange design" with long control surfaces fitted to struts behind each wing, it was powered by a  Renault 4Pb engine. Only one was built and the design was abandoned.

Specifications

References

Notes

Bibliography 

1930s French experimental aircraft
41
Single-engined tractor aircraft
Biplanes